Ambitle is a volcanic island which, together with Babase, another volcanic island, is one of the two Feni Islands in the Bismarck Archipelago. The island is located within the Papua New Guinea's New Ireland Province, to the east of the island of New Ireland.

It last erupted in about 350 BCE based on radiocarbon dating. Venting of hydrothermal water also occurs in coral reefs to the west of this island.

See also
List of volcanoes in Papua New Guinea

References
 

Islands of Papua New Guinea
Stratovolcanoes of Papua New Guinea
New Ireland Province
Pliocene stratovolcanoes
Pleistocene stratovolcanoes
Holocene stratovolcanoes